Angela "Angie" Lien (born January 16, 1981) is an American former competitive figure skater. She is the 2003 Winter Universiade silver medalist. She was the oldest competitor in the ladies' division at both the 2007 U.S. Figure Skating Championships and the 2008 U.S. Figure Skating Championships.

In 2013, Lien joined the Disney on Ice tour.

Results

Programs

References

External links
 Tracings.net profile

American female single skaters
1981 births
Living people
Sportspeople from Duluth, Minnesota
Universiade medalists in figure skating
Universiade silver medalists for the United States
Medalists at the 2003 Winter Universiade
21st-century American women
20th-century American women